Geranium cinereum, the ashy cranesbill, is a species of flowering plant in the family Geraniaceae, native to the Pyrenees. Leaves are deeply divided and grey-green – whence the Latin specific epithet cinereum "ash-grey". It flowers in summer, with striking black-eyed flowers with black stamens. 

In cultivation in the UK the following cultivars in the Cinereum Group have been given a Royal Horticultural Society Award of Garden Merit:- 
'Ballerina'
 = 'Blogold' 
'Giuseppe'
 Rothbury Gem = ‘Gerfos’

References

External links 

 Geranium cinereum in Catalogueoflife

cinereum
Plants described in 1787
Flora of the Pyrenees
Taxa named by Antonio José Cavanilles